Jann Arden is a Canadian pop singer. Her discography comprises twelve studio albums, two greatest hits albums, two live albums and forty singles.

Studio albums

1990s

2000s

2010s and 2020s

Compilation albums

Live albums

Singles

1980s and 1990s

2000s and 2010s

Other singles

Guest singles

Other charted songs

Music videos

References

Discographies of Canadian artists
Pop music discographies